A Flight Standards District Office (FSDO) is a locally affiliated field office of the United States Federal Aviation Administration.

There are 78 such offices nationwide as of November 2015 physically located in every state except for Delaware, New Hampshire, Rhode Island, and Vermont. Delaware is served by Philadelphia, Rhode Island is served by Boston, and Vermont and New Hampshire are served by Portland, Maine.

Purpose
The FSDOs serve as local representatives of the FAA. Each office reports to one of nine Regional FAA offices and perform a variety of compliance and enforcement actions. Such items include:

 Low-flying aircraft reporting
 Accident Reporting
 Air carrier certification and operations
 Aircraft maintenance
 Aircraft operational issues
 Aircraft permits
 Airmen certification (licensing) for pilots, mechanics, repairmen, dispatchers, and parachute riggers
 Certification and modification issues
 Enforcement of Airmen & Aircraft Regulations

References

Federal Aviation Administration